Dikwal is a village in Malvan Taluka of district Sindhudurg, Maharashtra, India. Its total area covered about 560 hectares. The Gawade family settled here from the village of Chowke and prior to that had come from the Gauda district of Karnataka. The local spoken language is Malvani.

This village has more water area, so it was muddy, and while walking in this area mud used to stick to legs and hence the area was introduced as dik which means "gum" (sticky glue) and wal means "wet".  In this way the area is known as Dik-wal, i.e. Dikwal.

As per the old and official record, the village of Dikwal had plenty of plants called dinda. In this village before the temple of local deity Gangeshwar, where villagers traditionally played a game, on every 'New Moon Day' called Bhavai.  They used to dig deep in soil where a man sat with a coconut in his hand and others were taken away or snatched away and then went for wash on stream.  Then again they came back to play a game, the part of starting God rituals, called dindwal (a game played with the stick of dinda).  A group of those trees (forest) were called dindwan.  So this way dindwal became dikwal.

Villagers residing in this village are all farmers.  Rice is a primary crop and supporting crops are taken with gardening, i.e. plantation. Most of them work in a city like Mumbai, Pune, or Delhi. Some of them are doing business. Most of them visit their native place in the month of May. This is a month of hot summer when in India it is a holiday for school students.

In the month of December they perform a god worship festival called Dahikalo. On this occasion all villagers come together to enjoy the celebration. Dahikalo is a drama based on happenings in the life of god. Different stories  are performed in the front of the temple on a permanent stage built for this purpose.

Education is also one of the reasons which make them settle in cities. The nearest market to Dikwal is Katta on the way to Malwan via Kasal. The walking distance is more than one and a half hours. The school at Dikwal is up to 4th standard. After that for next study students walk towards Katta, where they can study up to twelfth standard.

The village started developing in 1971 since when government started lookafter with the efforts of villagers. Villagers are able to build roads which helped to develop transport facilities. Now students can go to school with State Transport Bus (MSRTC).

The nearest railway station is Sindhudurg situated on the route of the Konkan Railway.  This station area is also known as Oras.  Oras is the city near Sindhudurg Station.

Families who live in Dikwal other than Gawade  Family include Parab, Dhuri, Patade, Malar, and Teli. Some of them have  their last name by the village name, Dikwalkar.

Some of the inhabitants were in Pakistan for service. A few of them returned to India after the partition of India and settled in Maharashtra in different villages. Gawade can be found in the whole of India. Many Gawade families have changed their name as they like. Most have changed their names to local village name. These all Gawade are 96 Kuli Maratha of Kashyap (Dhampal) Gotra. Family God is Jyotiba. Devak is Kalamb (Kalam). Shiva descendant and Preceptor saint Aatri. Incantation Gayatri Mantra and Veda followed is Yajurveda.

References

Villages in Sindhudurg district